The 14th annual Powerlist, which names the 100 most influential people of African or African Caribbean heritage in the United Kingdom, was judged by an independent panel and published in November 2020, sponsored by JP Morgan & Co, PricewaterhouseCoopers, Linklaters, Refinitiv, Herman Miller, Facebook and The Executive Leadership Council. The 2021 Powerlist came in a year in which public debate on racial injustice had increased, with the Black Lives Matter (BLM) movement and global protests against police brutality. Therefore, chief executive Michael Eboda decided that the 14th Powerlist would honour those who have used their voice to advocate against racial injustice. Furthermore, the rankings highlighted the work of healthcare professionals during the ongoing COVID-19 pandemic, which also resulted in the awards being held virtually on 17 November 2020, hosted by Kwame Kwei-Armah.

The award event was held in partnership with JP Morgan & Co., who announced they would invest £2 million in support to London non-profit organisations headed by black and minority ethnic leaders. The independent panel of judges named Sir Lewis Hamilton as the most influential awardee, due to both his sporting excellence and his advocacy in light of the BLM movement, with additional highlights of the Top 10 including Prof. Kevin Fenton for and Dame Donna Kinnair for their work fighting against COVID-19.

Top 10

Also in the Top 100, by Category 

Arts, Fashion and Design
 Chi-chi Nwanoku - Classical musician and founder of Chineke! Orchestra
 Duro Olowu - Fashion designer
 Dr Shirley J Thompson - Composer, conductor and Reader in Music at University of Westminster
 Pat McGrath - Make-up artist and founder of Pat McGrath Labs
 Francesca Hayward - Principal dancer, The Royal Ballet
 Grace Wales Bonner - Fashion designer, founder and Creative Director at Wales Bonner
 Kobna Holdbrook-Smith - Actor and founding member of "Act for Change"
 John Boyega - Actor
 Idris Elba - Actor and producer

Business, Corporate, Financiers and Entrepreneurs
 Femi Bamisaiye - CIO Homeserve 
 Nadja Bellan-White - Global CMO at Vice Media Group
 Jason Black (J2K) - Co-founder of Crep Protect and co-owner of Crepe and Cones
 Eric Collins - CEO and Founding Member, Impact X Capital Partners
 Camille Drummond - Vice President, Global Business Services at BP
 Yemi Edun - Founder/CEO of Daniel Ford & Co.
 Emeka Emembolu - Senior VP-North Sea BP
 Dean Forbes - President, The Access Group
 Pamela Hutchinson - Global Head of Diversity and Inclusion, Bloomberg
 Yvonne Ike  - Managing Director and Head of Sub-Saharan Africa region, BofA Securities
 Adrian Joseph - Managing Director, Group AI & Data Solutions, BT Group
 Wol Kolade -  Managing Partner, Livingbridge
 Lindelwe Lesley Ndlovu - CEO, AXA Africa Specialty Risks, Lloyd's of London
 Tara Lajumoke - Managing Director, Financial Times
 Netsai Mangwende - Head of Finance for Great Britain, Willis Towers Watson
 Tunde Olanrewaju - Senior Partner McKinsey & Company
 Paulette Rowe - CEO, Integrated and E-commerce Solutions, Paysafe Group
 Roni Savage - Managing Director, founder of Jomas Associates
 Alan Smith - Global Head of Risk Strategy and Chief of Staff, Global Risk at HSBC
 Tevin Tobun - Founder and CEO, GV Group Gate Ventures
 Sandra Wallace - UK Managing Partner, DLA Piper
 Dame Sharon White - Chairman, John Lewis Partnership

Media, Publishing and Entertainment
 Kamal Ahmed - Editorial Director, BBC News
 Akala - Rapper, journalist, poet and activist
 Amma Asante - Writer, director
 Lorna Clarke - BBC Controller of Pop Music
 Reni Eddo-Lodge - Journalist, author
 Bernardine Evaristo - Writer, Professor of Creative Writing at Brunel University London
 Sir Lenny Henry - Actor, writer, campaigner
 Vanessa Kingori - Publisher, British Vogue
 Dorothy Koomson - Author
 Anne Mensah - Vice-president of Content UK, Netflix
 Hugh Muir - Senior Assistant Editor, The Guardian
 Femi Oguns - Founder and CEO of Identity School of Acting
 Marcus Ryder - Executive Producer of Multimedia Caixin
 Paulette Simpson - Executive, Corporate Affairs and Public Policy, Jamaica National Group; Executive Director, The Voice Media Group
 Annette Thomas - CEO The Guardian Media Group
 Charlene White - ITN News Anchor
 Reggie Yates - Actor, broadcaster and DJ
 Gary Younge - Journalist and author; Professor of Sociology at University of Manchester

Politics, Law and Religion
 Stephanie Boyce - Deputy Vice-President Law Society of England and Wales
 Martin Forde - Barrister
 Rev Rose Hudson-Wilkin - Bishop of Dover
 David Lammy - Shadow Secretary of State for Justice, Member of Parliament for Tottenham
 Harry Matovu - Barrister
 Dr Kathryn Nwajiaku - Director, Politics and Governance Overseas Development Institute
 Dr Sandie Okoro - Senior Vice President and Group General Counsel, World Bank
 Segun Osuntokun - Managing Partner, Bryan Cave Leighton Paisner
 Joshua Siaw - Partner, White & Case
 Patrick Vernon - Political activist
 Marcia Willis Stewart - Director, Birnberg Peirce & Partners

Public, Third Sector and Education
 Sonita Alleyne - Master, Jesus College, Cambridge
 Dr Margaret Casely-Hayford - Chair, Shakespeare's Globe, Chancellor of Coventry University, Non-Executive Director, Co-op Group
 Nira Chamberlain - President of Institute of Mathematics and its Applications
 Professor Patricia Daley - Vice Principle of Jesus College, Oxford
 Dr Anne-Marie Imafidon - CEO and co-founder Stemettes
 Professor Funmi Olonisakin - Professor of Security, Leadership and Development at King's College London, Founding Director of African Leadership Centre
 Marvin Rees - Mayor of Bristol
 Lord Woolley - Co-founder/Director, Operation Black Vote

Science, Medicine and Engineering
 Dr Sylvia Bartley - Senior Global Director, Medtronic Foundation
 Professor Jacqueline Dunkley-Bent - Chief Midwifery Officer, NHS England
 Dr Jacqui Dyer - President of Mental Health Foundation
 Dr Paula Franklin - Chief Medical Officer at Bupa
 Dr Martin Griffiths - Lead trauma surgeon, Royal London Hospital & Clinical Director for Violence Reduction, NHS
 Dr Ian Nnatu - Consultant psychiatrist
 Dr Joy Odili - Consultant plastic surgeon
 Dr Emeka Okaro - Consultant Obstetrician and Gynaecologist
 Prof. Laura Serrant - Head of Department and Professor of Community and Public Health Nursing at Manchester Metropolitan University
 Dr Samantha Tross - Consultant Orthopaedic Surgeon

Sports
 Dina Asher Smith - British record-holding sprinter
 Anthony Joshua - Boxer
 Marcus Rashford - Footballer and campaigner against child poverty
 Raheem Sterling - Footballer

Technology
 Nneka Abulokwe - Founder and CEO, MicroMax Consulting
 Ije Nwokorie - Senior Director, Apple
 Ebele Okobi - Public policy director, Africa, the Middle East and Turkey for Facebook
 Jacky Wright - Chief digital officer & Corporate VP at Microsoft

References

 
Biographical dictionaries
Lists of British people
Yearbooks